Fiona Stafford FBA is Professor of English Language and Literature and a Fellow of Somerville College at the University of Oxford.

Early life and education
Stafford was born in Lincoln but moved around during her childhood following her father's postings in the Royal Air Force. She studied for a BA in English language and literature at the University of Leicester, writing a dissertation on RAF slang. She then studied at the University of Oxford gaining an M. Phil in English Language and Literature and a D.Phil. Her thesis was on The sublime savage : a study of James Macpherson and the poems of Ossian in relation to the cultural context of Scotland in the 1750s and 1760s.

Career
After a short spell teaching in the United States Stafford returned to Oxford and was appointed a tutorial fellow of Somerville College. She is also Professor of English Language and Literature in the Faculty of English of the University of Oxford.

Her areas of research include "Ossian, Austen, Burns, Wordsworth, Coleridge, Keats, the Shelleys, Byron, Heaney, Carson, literature of the Romantic period, the literature of place, nature writing (old and new), Scottish poetry after 1700, dialogues between English, Irish and Scottish literature, literature and the visual arts, and contemporary poetry".

In 2018 she was elected a Fellow of the British Academy.

In 2019 the University of Leicester conferred on her an honorary doctorate of letters.

Selected publications

  (winner of the Rose Mary Crawshay Prize, 2011

References

External links

 

Year of birth missing (living people)
Living people
Fellows of the British Academy
Fellows of Somerville College, Oxford
Alumni of the University of Oxford
Alumni of the University of Leicester